Scotorythra leptias is a moth of the family Geometridae. It was first described by Edward Meyrick in 1899. It is endemic to the Hawaiian island of Oahu.

It might be a synonym or form of Scotorythra brunnea.

The wingspan is about 36 mm.

External links

L
Endemic moths of Hawaii
Biota of Oahu